Sofia Kristina Maria Gustafsson (born 22 December 1990) is a Swedish female curler.

She is a 2009 Swedish mixed doubles curling champion.

Teams

Women's

Mixed

Mixed doubles

References

External links
 
 
 

Living people
1990 births
Swedish female curlers
Swedish curling champions